The Order of the Federal Republic (OFR) is one of two orders of merit, established by the Federal Republic of Nigeria in 1963.  It is senior to the Order of the Niger.

The highest honours where the Grand Commander in the Order of the Federal Republic and Grand Commander in the Order of the Niger are awarded to the President and Vice-President respectively. The Presiding Judge in the Supreme Court and the Chairman of the Senate are qualitate and ex officio Commander in the Order of the Niger.

The Nigerians have followed the British example in the form and structure of the Order. There are also post-nominal letters for the members of the Order of the Niger.

There is a Civil Division and a Military Division. The ribbon of the latter division has a small red line in the middle.

Grades

The order has four grades:

 Grand Commander of the Order of the Federal Republic (GCFR)
 Commander of the Order of the Federal Republic (CFR)
 Officer of the Order of the Federal Republic (OFR)
 Member of the Order of the Federal Republic (MFR)

Recipients

Grand Commander of the Order of the Federal Republic (GCFR)

Shehu Shagari
Abdulsalami Abubakar
Ibrahim Babangida
Goodluck Jonathan
Moshood Abiola
Muammar Gaddafi
Muhammadu Buhari
Nelson Mandela
Nnamdi Azikiwe
Obafemi Awolowo
Olusegun Obasanjo 
Queen Elizabeth II
Sani Abacha
Umaru Musa Yar'Adua
Ernest Shonekan

Grand Commander of the Order of the Niger (GCON) 
Joseph Wayas
Adetokunbo Ademola
Shehu Musa Yar'Adua
Alex Ekwueme
Aliko Dangote
Atiku Abubakar
Bello Maitama Yusuf
Goodluck Jonathan
Idris Legbo Kutigi
Mike Adenuga
Mike Akhigbe
Murtala Nyako
Namadi Sambo
Yemi Osinbajo
Anyim Pius Anyim
Ngozi Okonjo-Iweala
 Amina J. Mohammed
Sen. Ahmad Ibrahim Lawan
Justice Ibrahim Tanko Muhammad
Justice Olukayode Ariwoola

Commander of the Order of the Federal Republic (CFR) 
Sultan Muhammadu Maccido
Sultan Sa'adu Abubakar
Jim Ovia
Emir of Zazzau Ahmad Bamalli
Alwali Kazir
Aminu Tambuwal
Clement Isong
Daniel Aladesanmi II
Mohammed Bello Adoke
Victoria Gowon
Yahaya Abubakar
Ngozi Okonjo-Iweala
Abubakar Gumi
Orodje Of Okpe Kingdom, Orhue 1
Tony Elumelu
Femi Gbajabiamila
Ovie Omo-Agege
Boss Mustapha
Yakubu Dogara
Abba kyari
Folashede Yemi-Esan
Justice Kudirat MO Kekere-Ekun 
Justice Musa Dattijo Muhammad
Justice Monica Bolna'an Dongban-Mensem
Justice Ayo Salami
Lt. Gen. Ibrahim Attahiru
Lt. Gen. Lamidi O. Adeosun (Rtd)
Gen. Lucky E.O. Irabor
Lt. Gen. Farouk Yahaya
Air Marshal Oladayo Amao
Vice Admiral Awwal Zubairu Gambo
Gen. Gabriel Abayomi Olonisakin

Lt. Gen. Yusuf Tukur Buratai
Vice Admiral Ibok-Ete Ekwe Ibas
 Hon Justice  Clara Bata Ogunbiyi
Air Mashal Sadique Abubakar
Mohammed Abubakar Adamu
Mr. Usman Alkali Baba
Maj. Gen. Babagana Monguno (Rtd)
Alh. Ahmed Rufai Abubakar
Yusuf Magaji Bichi
HM Oba Adeyeye Enitan Ogunwusi Ojaja II
HM Omo N'Oba E'Edo Uku Akpolokpolo Ewuare II
His Highness, Alhaji Aminu Ado Bayero
HRH Ahmed Nuhu Bamali
HRH Prof. James Ortese Ayatse
HRH Abubakar Shehu Abubakar III
HRH Alh. Muhammadu Ibn Abali Muhammad Idrissa
Da. Jacob Gyang Buba
HRH Justice Sidi Bage Muhammad I (JSC Rtd)
HM King Dandeson Douglas JAJA
HRM Oba Gabriel Adejuwon
HM Oba (Dr) Aladetoyinbo Ogunlade Aladelusi Odundun II
HRH Oba Babatunde Adewale-Ajayi 
His Eminence, Ntenyin (Dr) Solomon Daniel Etuk, JP 
HRM Ogiame Atuwatse III 
HRM Igwe Amb. Lawrence Agubuzu 
HRM King Alfred Diete-Spiff 
HRM Eze (Dr) E.C. Okeke
HRM Eze Joseph Ndubuisi Nwabeke
HRM Eze Charles N. Nkpuma
Col. Hameed Ibrahim Ali (Rtd)
Solomon Ehigiator Arase
Sir Dr. Kessington Adebukunola Adebutu 
Mr. jim Ovia
Chief Oluwole Olanipekun

Alhaji Abdul Samad Rabiu
Dr. Eruani Azibapu Godbless
Maj. Gen. Bashir Salihu Magashi (Rtd)

Officer of the Order of the Federal Republic (OFR) 
Afe Babalola
Dahiru Usman Bauchi 
Abdullahi Umar Ganduje
Ayo Oritsejafor
Babatunde Jose
Buhari Bala
Christopher E. Abebe
Archbishop Ignatius Ayau KAIGAMA

Grace Alele-Williams
Idris Legbo Kutigi
Innocent Umezulike
Magaji muhammed 
 Hon Justice  Ibrahim Auta Ndahi
Muhammad Indimi
Umaru Baba 
Lere Paimo
Shettima Mustapha
Kawu Sumaila
S. A. Ajayi
 Adesoye J.Omololu
Taiwo Akinkunmi
Tijjani Muhammad-Bande
 Julius Rone. LNG Philanthropic Oil Merchant
Temitope Balogun Joshua (born June 12, 1963), commonly referred to as T. B. Joshua, was a Nigerian charismatic pastor, televangelist and philanthropist.

Member of the Order of the Federal Republic (MFR) 
Tony Elumelu
Albatan Yerima Balla
Kofoworola Ademola
Lere Paimo
Genevieve Nnaji
Susanne Wenger
Omotola Ekeinde
Olu Jacobs
Osita Iheme
Mathew Benabafa Seiyefa
Ibrahim Likita Mashi
HRH Alhaji Sule Bawa
Col. Andrawus Pillasar Sawa
Brig. Gen. Dzarma Kennedy Zirkushu
Benjamin Okoko 
Dr. Hannatu Fika Adamu
Dr. Hamidu Mohammed 
Saleh Abubakar 
Prof Sani Abubakar Lugga 
Tijjani Yahaya Kaura 
Col. Bala Mande (Rtd) 
Mrs. Comfort Nwobu 
Lady Eno Bassey 
Evang. Blessing Bassey 
Prof Adebayo M. A. Ninalowo 
Dr. Gloria Laraba Shoda 
Cardinal Dr. James O. Odunmbaku 
Ogunesan Hannah Oluwumi 
Mr. Ajibola Akindele 
DIG Sanusi N. Lemu
DIG Joseph O. Egbunike 
Ag. CGIS Isah Jere Idris 
Isiaka Abdulmumini Haliru 
Anthonia Ifeoma Opara 
Talatu Mairo Isa 
Elton Irene Edorhe 
Bashir Adewale Adeniyi 
Haliru Nababa 
Ahmad Muhammadu Tukur 
Amb. Demenongo Apollonius 
Amb. Kim Solomon AMIEYEOFORI

Member of the Order of Niger (MON) 
Imam Abdullahi Abubakar
HRM Eze Isaac Ikonne
Chief Silva Ejeh Ameh
Alh. Kamoru Ibitoye Yusuf
Mallam Ibrahim Okposi
Alhaji Shehu Othman

References

External links

 
Orders, decorations, and medals of Nigeria